Komasi may refer to:
 Komasi-ye Sofla
 Komasi-ye Vosta